The Soviet Jewry movement was an international human rights campaign that advocated for the right of Jews in the Soviet Union to emigrate. The movement's participants were most active in the United States and in the Soviet Union. Those who were denied permission to emigrate were often referred to by the term Refusenik.

Major activities
The majority of activities in the West were aimed at raising awareness about the lack of freedom to emigrate from the Soviet Union.

American Jewish organizations
In the United States, a number of Jewish organizations became involved in the struggle for Soviet Jewish emigration. Jewish establishment organizations such as the American Jewish Committee and the World Jewish Congress coordinated their efforts in the American Jewish Conference on Soviet Jewry (AJCSJ), later renamed to the National Conference on Soviet Jewry (NCSJ). New grassroots organizations also played an important role. Examples are the Cleveland Council on Soviet Anti-Semitism and Jacob Birnbaum's Student Struggle for Soviet Jewry. Most organization kept their activities within the realm of public outreach, diplomacy and peaceful protest. An exception was the Jewish Defense League led by Meir Kahane whose members occasionally turned to violent protest. The main slogan of the movement was: Let my people go.

Activities, particularly demonstrations, continued year after year.

Jackson–Vanik Amendment
In the early 1970s, the issue of Soviet Jewish emigration became entangled with the U.S.'s Cold War agenda. In 1972, Senator Henry "Scoop" Jackson (D-WA) introduced the Jackson–Vanik amendment to the Trade Act of 1974. The amendment linked U.S. trade relations with non-market economies such as the Soviet Union to these countries' restrictions on the freedom of emigration and other human rights. Countries that restricted the freedom of emigration were unable to achieve Most Favored Nation status. The amendment passed in 1974. The basis, as worded in the actual legislation, was "To assure the continued dedication of the United States to fundamental human rights." By giving the Soviet Union an economic incentive to allow free emigration, it led, particularly after the Yom Kippur War, to a gradual increase in permission to leave the USSR.

Raising awareness
Much of the awareness raising that American organizations participated in centered on individuals. A prominent example is the publicization of the plight of Soviet activist Natan Sharansky. His wife Avital had an about-to-expire permit to leave the Soviet Union, which she used. Both Avital and Sharansky's mother, Ida Milgrom, used publicity in cooperation with international organizations to advocate for Sharansky's right to leave: Avital from around the free world, Milgrom from within the USSR. Another individual whose wish to emigrate was highly publicized was Ida Nudel.

History

The West did not become involved in the movement until the mid-1960s. One of the earliest organized effort was the Cleveland Council on Soviet Anti-Semitism, a grassroots organization that brought attention to the plight of Soviet Jews from 1963 until 1983.  It began as a study group led by three of the founding members of Beth Israel – The West Temple in 1963: Louis Rosenblum, Herbert Caron, and Abe Silverstein. Though the council included prominent rabbis, pastors, priests, and city officials, many initial council members were fellow congregants.  As the first such group in the world, this organization spawned other local councils and a national organization. Between 1964–69, the Cleveland council developed educational tools, such as organizational handbooks for other communities, the newsletter Spotlight, and media presentations. They also devised protest strategies that became integral to the movement to free Soviet Jewry.  One of the council's most successful activities was the People-to-People program of the late 1960s, which represented 50,000 members.

Although not officially sponsored by Beth Israel – The West Temple, the temple provided office space to the council from 1964–78, and the council periodically reported to the congregation's Social Action Committee. Although the Cleveland council was still active in 1985, by the late 1970s the Jewish Community Federation had taken over the major local organizing effort for Soviet Jewry. By 1993, the Cleveland Council on Soviet Anti-Semitism no longer needed to exist, as it had accomplished its mission, and the Soviet Union had also ceased to exist.

Later, Student Struggle for Soviet Jewry, founded by Jacob Birnbaum at Yeshiva University in 1964. In 1969, the Jewish Defense League began a series of protests and vigils while employing militant activism in order to publicize the persecution of Soviet Jewry. The Union of Councils for Soviet Jews was formed in 1970 as an umbrella organization of all groups working to win the right to emigrate for oppressed Jewish citizens of the Soviet Union.

The movement was represented in Israel by Nativ, a clandestine agency that sought to publicize the cause of Soviet Jewry and encourage their emigration to Israel.

Tensions between wings of movement
Throughout the most intense period of the movement to free Jews from the USSR – 1964–1991 – tensions existed between the Jewish Establishment groups, represented by the umbrella organization the American Jewish Conference on Soviet Jewry and its successor the National Conference on Soviet Jewry. Differences revolved around policy and action. Generally, establishment organizations supported a more moderate approach whereas grassroots organizations preferred a more vocal approach. Behind the scenes, the clandestine Israeli Soviet Jewry office, Nativ (known as the Lishka), supported the ACSJ and NCSJ, which it had helped create. Such conflicts between Establishment and nascent, independent groups – such as between the NAACP and SNCC in the civil rights movement – are not new.

Tensions also arose between Israel and the American side of the movement over the drop-out phenomenon. Drop-outs were Jews who left the Soviet Union on an exit visa to Israel but changed their destination (primarily to the United States) once their reached the half-way station in Vienna. Israel, which needed Soviet Jews to offset demographic trends in the country to maintain a Jewish majority, wanted to stop people from dropping out. American Jewish organizations, however, supported these emigrants' freedom to choose their destination.

See also
 National Conference on Soviet Jewry
 Cleveland Council on Soviet Anti-Semitism
 Aliyah from the Soviet Union in the 1970s
 Jewish Defense League
 National Coalition Supporting Soviet Jewry
 Refusenik (Soviet Union)
 Student Struggle for Soviet Jewry
 Union of Councils for Soviet Jews
 World Jewish Congress

References

Bibliography
 Altshuler, Stuart. From Exodus to Freedom: A History of the Soviet Jewry Movement. Rowman & Littlefield, 2005
 Beckerman, Gal. When They Come for Us, We'll Be Gone: The Epic Struggle to Save Soviet Jewry. Houghton Mifflin Harcourt, 2010
 Freedman, Robert Owen. Soviet Jewry in the 1980s: The Politics of Anti-Semitism and Emigration and the Dynamics of Resettlement. Duke University Press, 1989
 Kahane, Meir. The Story of the Jewish Defense League. Chilton Book Company, 1975
 Schroeter, Leonard. The Last Exodus. University of Washington Press, 1979
 A Second Exodus: The American movement to Free Soviet Jews. Eds. Murray Friedman and Albert D. Chernin. University Press of New England, 1999

External links
 Educational website: Let My People Go – a free educational resource created by the Israeli Prime Minister's Office (Nativ), to keep the story of Soviet Jewry alive and to inspire the next generation.
 The Refusenik Project – a free educational resource

Aliyah
Movements for civil rights
Minority rights
Jews and Judaism in the Soviet Union
Antisemitism in the Soviet Union
Freedom of movement